This is a list of notable people from Norway.

Architecture

Art

Literature 

 Ingvar Ambjørnsen, author
 Tryggve Andersen, novelist, poet
 Peter Christen Asbjørnsen (1812–1885), writer, folklorist
 Kjell Aukrust, author and illustrator
 Olav Aukrust, poet
 Ari Behn, author; ex-husband of Princess Märtha Louise of Norway
 André Bjerke, poet and author
 Jens Bjørneboe, author and poet
 Bjørnstjerne Bjørnson, poet and author, Nobel Prize in Literature winner
 Ketil Bjørnstad, author, composer, musician
 Johan Bojer, novelist and dramatist
 Johan Borgen, author
 Christian Braunmann Tullin (1728–1765); businessman and poet
 Johan Nordahl Brun (1745–1816); author, poet, dramatist, politician
 Olaf Bull, poet
 Lars Saabye Christensen, author and poet
 Camilla Collett (1813–1895), writer, feminist
 Olav Duun, author
 Tom Egeland, author
 Peter Egge, author, journalist, playwright
 Thorbjørn Egner, playwright, songwriter and illustrator
 Anne Karin Elstad, author
 Kristian Elster, novelist, journalist, literary critic
 Sven Elvestad, journalist and author
 Carl Fredrik Engelstad, writer, playwright, journalist, translator
 Johan Falkberget, author
 Kjartan Fløgstad, author
 Jon Fosse, author, poet and playwright
 Jostein Gaarder, author
 Arne Garborg, author and poet
 Hulda Garborg, poet and author
 Inger Hagerup, author, playwright and poet
 Kjell Hallbing, author
 Knut Hamsun, author of Hunger, Nobel Prize in Literature winner
 Erik Fosnes Hansen, author and poet
 Jørgen Haugan, author and lecturer
 Olav H. Hauge, horticulturist, translator and poet
 Hans Herbjørnsrud, author
 Sigurd Hoel, author
 Ludvig Holberg (1684–1754), historian and playwright
 Henrik Ibsen, playwright and poet, author of A Doll's House
 Sigurd Ibsen, author and politician
 Roy Jacobsen, author
 Rolf Jacobsen, poet
 Alexander Kielland, author
 Jan Kjærstad, author
 Karl Ove Knausgård, novelist, author of My Struggle
 Thomas Krag, novelist, playwright
 Vilhelm Krag, poet
 Trude Brænne Larssen, author
 Henry Lawson, author
 Bernt Lie, novelist
 Jonas Lie, author
 Jørgen Moe, folklorist
 Lise Myhre, cartoonist
 Dagne Groven Myhren, literature researcher
 Jo Nesbø, author
 Christopher Nielsen, cartoonist
 Sigbjørn Obstfelder, writer and poet
 Alf Prøysen, author, poet, folk singer and entertainer
 Nini Roll Anker, novelist, playwright
 Margit Sandemo, author
 Aksel Sandemose, author
 Gabriel Scott, poet, novelist, playwright and children's writer
 Amalie Skram, writer, feminist
 Dag Solstad, author
 Marta Steinsvik, author
 Edvard Storm, poet, songwriter, educator
 Jens Tvedt, novelist, writer
 Sigrid Undset, author of Kristin Lavransdatter, Nobel Prize in Literature winner
 Halldis Moren Vesaas, poet and author
 Tarjei Vesaas, author and poet
 Jan Erik Vold, lyric poet
 Aasmund Olavsson Vinje, poet and author
 Herbjørg Wassmo, author
 Johan Sebastian Welhaven, poet
 Henrik Wergeland, poet
 Johan Herman Wessel, poet
 Peter Wessel Zapffe, writer and philosopher
 Knut Ødegård, author
 Finn Øglænd, author
 Frode Øverli, cartoonist

Music 

 Morten Abel, musician (Mods, Peltz, The September When, Solo)
 Ivar F. Andresen, basso profundo opera singer 
 Astrid S (real name Astrid Smeplass), singer-songwriter
 Savant, musician (edm, real name Aleksander Vinter)
 Svein Berge, musician (Röyksopp)
 Margaret Berger, singer-songwriter
 Jarle Bernhoft, singer-songwriter
 Geir Botnen, pianist
 Ole Bull, violinist, composer
 Euronymous (real name Øystein Aarseth), musician (Mayhem)
 Fenriz (real name Gylve Nagell), musician, metal guru (Darkthrone)
 Kirsten Flagstad, soprano
 Magne Furuholmen, keyboardist and songwriter (a-ha)
 Gaahl (real name Kristian Espedal), singer (Gorgoroth)
 Anja Garbarek, singer-songwriter
 Jan Garbarek, musician
 Håvard Gimse, classical pianist
 Ernst Glaser, violinist
 Gottfried von der Goltz, violinist, conductor
 Edvard Grieg, composer
 Eivind Groven, composer
 Sigmund Groven, harmonica virtuoso, composer
 Lona Gyldenkrone (1848–1934), opera singer
 Johan Halvorsen, composer
 Morten Harket, singer
 Ørjan Hartveit, opera singer
 Björn Haugan, opera singer
 Dag-Are Haugan, electronic musician
 Ian Haugland, drummer (Europe)
 Kate Havnevik, singer-songwriter, composer, musician, pianist, guitarist, melodica player
 Hank von Helvete (real name Hans Erik Husby), singer (Turbonegro)
 Tone Groven Holmboe, composer
 Wilhelmine Holmboe-Schenström (1842–1939), opera singer
 Tom Hugo, singer
 Carl Høgset, conductor (Grex Vocalis)
 Ihsahn (real name Vegard Sverre Tveitan), musician (Emperor)
 Christian Ingebrigtsen singer-songwriter for A1
 David Monrad Johansen, composer
 Deeyah Khan, singer, film director, music producer, composer, and human rights defender
 Roy Khan, singer (Kamelot)
 Olav Kielland, conductor, composer
 Henning Kraggerud, violinist
 Solveig Kringlebotn, soprano
 Trond Kverno, composer
 Girl in Red (Real name Marie Ulven Ringheim), singer, songwriter
 Sissel Kyrkjebø, singer
 Jørn Lande, singer
 Andy LaPlegua, DJ
 Marit Larsen, singer-songwriter
 Ronni Le Tekrø, musician and guitarist
 Sondre Lerche, singer-songwriter
 Herman Severin Løvenskiold, composer of La Sylphide ballet
 Rolf Løvland, musician (Secret Garden)
 Anni-Frid Lyngstad, lead singer (ABBA)
 Lene Marlin, singer-songwriter
 Tom Mathisen, humorist singer
 Maria Mena, singer-songwriter
 Egil Monn-Iversen, composer
 Truls Mørk, cellist
 Henny Mürer, choreographer and dancer
 Øyvind Mustaparta, musician (Dimmu Borgir)
 Wenche Myhre, singer
 Necrobutcher (real name Jørn Stubberud), musician (Mayhem)
 Lars Nedland, musician (Solefald)
 Joachim Nielsen a.k.a. Jokke, rock singer, poet
 Kurt Nilsen, pop singer (World Idol winner)
 Nocturno Culto (real name Ted Skjellum), musician (Darkthrone)
 Arne Nordheim, modernist composer
 Rikard Nordraak, composer
 John Norum, guitarist (Europe)
 Lene Nystrøm, pop singer (Aqua)
 Opaque (real name Morten Aasdahl Eliassen), rapper
 Tord Øverland-Knudsen, bassist (The Wombats)
 Erlend Øye, musician (Kings of Convenience)
 Ole Paus, singer-songwriter
 Alf Prøysen, author and musician
 Marion Raven, singer-songwriter
 Hans Rotmo, singer-songwriter
 Kari Rueslåtten, singer
 Alexander Rybak, singer, actor, violinist, pianist, composer (Eurovision song contest winner 2009)
 Terje Rypdal, guitarist, composer
 Gisle Saga, music producer, songwriter
 Samoth (real name Tomas Haugen), musician (Emperor)
 Knut Schreiner, musician (Turbonegro, Euroboys)
 Sigrid, singer-songwriter
 Berit Skjefte (1809–1899), langeleik performer
 Magna Lykseth-Skogman (1874–1948), Norwegian-born Swedish opera singer
 Gjendine Slålien (1871–1972), folk singer
 Njål Sparbo, singer
 Vibeke Stene, singer (ex-Tristania)
 Alexander Stenerud, singer-songwriter (Zuma)
 Øystein Sunde, singer, guitarist
 Johan Svendsen, composer
 Harald Sæverud, composer
 Tommy Tee (real name Tommy Flaaten), rapper, producer, DJ
 Jahn Teigen, singer
 Arve Tellefsen, violin virtuoso
 Stian Thoresen, singer (Dimmu Borgir)
 Geirr Tveitt, composer
 Varg Vikernes, musician (Burzum) and convicted murderer
 Paul Waaktaar-Savoy, songwriter and guitarist (a-ha)
 Alan Walker, DJ and producer
 Toki Wartooth, guitarist (Dethklok)
 Sigurd Wongraven, singer-guitarist (Satyricon)
 Erlend Øye, musician
 Aurora Aksnes, singer-songwriter

See also:
 Music of Norway

Painting and sculpture 

 Nils Aas, sculptor
 Betzy Akersloot-Berg, painter
 Peter Nicolai Arbo, painter
 Nikolai Astrup, painter
 Harriet Backer, painter
 Peder Balke, painter
 Brynjulf Bergslien, sculptor
 Andreas Bloch, painter
 Tupsy Clement, painter
 Hans Dahl, painter
 J.C. Dahl, painter
 Brit Dyrnes, ceramist
 Bjorn Egeli, painter
 Yngvild Fagerheim, ceramist
 Thomas Fearnley, painter
 Johannes Flintoe, painter
 Magne Furuholmen, painter, sculptor
 Åse Frøyshov, textile artist
 Rolf Groven, painter
 Hans Gude, painter
 Aasta Hansteen, painter
 Lars Hertervig, painter
 Thorolf Holmboe, painter
 Olaf Isaachsen, painter
 Theodor Kittelsen, painter
 Annelise Knudtzon, textile artist
 Christian Krohg, painter
 Oda Krohg, painter
 Edvard Munch, painter
 Odd Nerdrum, painter
 Wilhelm Peters, painter
 Eilif Peterssen, painter
 Børre Sæthre, artist
 Vebjørn Sand, painter
 Christiane Schreiber, painter
 Otto Sinding, painter
 Christian Skredsvig, painter
 Harald Sohlberg, painter
 Frits Thaulow, painter
 Adolph Tidemand, painter
 Gustav Vigeland, sculptor
 Erik Werenskiold, painter, illustrator

Film and comedy 

 Hauk Aabel, actor
 Atle Antonsen, comedian
 Ivo Caprino, animation film creator
 Lalla Carlsen, actress
 Espen Eckbo, comedian, actor
 Egil Eide, silent film actor and director
 Harald Eia, comedian, actor
 Thomas Giertsen, comedian, actor
 Laura Gundersen, actress
 Gunnar Haugan (1925–2009), character actor
 Solveig Haugan (1901–1953), stage and movie actress
 Harald Heide-Steen Jr., comedian, actor
 Per Heimly, photographer, jester
 Henrik Holm, actor
 Ola Isene, opera singer
 Otto Jespersen, comedian
 Bård Tufte Johansen, comedian
 Kristoffer Joner, actor
 David Knudsen, actor
 Geir Ove Kvalheim, director
 Mette Lange-Nielsen, actress
 Natassia Malthe, model, actress
 Henny Moan, actress
 Lillian Müller, model, actress
 August Oddvar, stage actor
 Arve Opsahl, comedian, actor
 Iren Reppen, actress
 Tarjei Sandvik Moe, actor
 Kristopher Schau, comedian
 Aud Schønemann, actress
 Bjørn Sundquist, actor
 Rut Tellefsen, actress
 Gerd Thoreid, stand-up comedian and singer
 Liv Ullmann, actress, film director
 Ingerid Vardund, actress
 Line Verndal, actress
 Rolv Wesenlund, comedian, actor
 Ragna Wettergreen, actress
 Øystein Wiik, actor
 Viktoria Winge, actress
 Tommy Wirkola, film director
 Ylvis, comedy duo famous for their viral hit song and video "The Fox (What Does the Fox Say?)"
 Harald Zwart, film director

Exploration 

 Roald Amundsen (1872–1928), polar explorer, first to reach the South Pole and the first seaman to traverse the Northwest Passage
 Bernt Balchen (1899–1973), Norwegian-American polar aviation pioneer
 Samuel Balto, arctic explorer
 Carl Bock, government official, author, naturalist and explorer
 Finn Devold (1902–1987), arctic explorer
 Hallvard Devold, polar explorer
 Leif Erikson, world explorer
 Rune Gjeldnes, polar (solo) adventurer
 Tryggve Gran (1889–1980), aviator, made the first solo flight across the North Sea
 Tormod Granheim, climber and extreme skier, 1st ski descent Mount Everest North Face, 2006
 Thor Heyerdahl (1914–2002), explorer and anthropologist, famous for his Kon-Tiki exploration
 Helge Ingstad (1899–2001), explorer, first to prove ca. 1000 AD Viking settlements in America
 Hjalmar Johansen (1867–1913), polar explorer
 Erling Kagge, polar solo adventurer, climber
 Carl Anton Larsen (1860–1924), Antarctic explorer and first person to ski in Antarctica on the Larsen Ice Shelf; considered the founder of the Antarctic whaling industry and the settlement at Grytviken, South Georgia
 Henry Larsen, Norwegian born Canadian Arctic seaman for the Royal Canadian Mounted Police; second to traverse Canada's Northwest Passage in the St. Roch
 Christian Leden (1882–1957), Greenland and Canada
 Lars Monsen, adventurer
 Jens Munk (1579–1628), explorer of the Northwest Passage
 Fridtjof Nansen (1861–1930), Arctic explorer, scientist and international statesman
 Børge Ousland, polar solo adventurer
 Finn Rønne (1899–1980), Norwegian-American antarctic explorer
 Otto Sverdrup (1854–1930), Arctic explorer

Politics 
 Peder A. Aarøe, former trade unionist
 Arne Aasheim, diplomat and civil servant
 Ingrid Aune, Mayor of Malvik (2015–2019)
 Anton Christian Bang, former Minister of Education and Church Affairs
 Kjell Magne Bondevik, former prime minister, author
 Per Borten, former prime minister, author
 Trygve Bratteli, former prime minister, author
 Gro Harlem Brundtland, former prime minister, former Director General of the World Health Organization, author, first female prime minister in Norway.
 Torstein Dahle
 Kristin Krohn Devold
 Odd Einar Dørum
 Jan Egeland, UN Under-Secretary-General for Humanitarian Affairs and Emergency Relief Coordinator
 Gunhild Emanuelsen (1914–2006), pacifist, women's rights activist, trade unionist and politician
 Jens Evensen
 Geir Flikke, political scientist
 Per-Kristian Foss
 Einar Gerhardsen, former prime minister, author
 Trond Giske
 Carl I. Hagen
 Kristin Halvorsen, former Minister of Finance
 C. J. Hambro
 Valgerd Svarstad Haugland, former leader of "Kristelig folkeparti", The Christian people's party.
 Marianne Heiberg
 Johan Jørgen Holst
 Sigurd Ibsen, author and politician
 Hilde Frafjord Johnson
 Mona Juul, diplomat
 Trygve Halvdan Lie, first UN Secretary-General
 Christian Michelsen, 1905 independence engineer
 Johan Nygaardsvold
 Jan Petersen
 Vidkun Quisling (1887–1945), military officer and fascist leader
 Terje Rød-Larsen, diplomat
 Erna Solberg, former Prime Minister
 Lars Sponheim
 Jens Stoltenberg, former Prime Minister, Secretary General of NATO
 Thorvald Stoltenberg, former Minister of Foreign Affairs and Minister of Defence
 Shoaib Sultan, Muslim candidate for Oslo mayorship
 Martha Tynæs (1870–1930), pioneering member of the Norwegian Labour Party's Women's Federation
 Kåre Willoch, former Prime Minister, author
 See also:
 List of Norwegian Prime Ministers
 List of Norwegian monarchs

Sciences, research, engineering 

 Odd Aalen, statistician
 Arne Jørgen Aasen (born 1939), chemist
 Ivar Aasen (1813–1896), linguist, nynorsk proponent
 Arnstein Aassve (born 1968), demographer and economist
 Niels Henrik Abel (1802–1829), mathematician
 Harald Tveit Alvestrand, computer scientist
 Colin Archer (1832–1921), ship builder
 Fredrik Barth, anthropologist
 Drude Berntsen (born 1939), computer scientist
 Kristian Birkeland (1867–1917), physicist and industrialist
 Vilhelm Bjerknes (1862–1951), meteorologist, father of modern weather forecasting
 Magne Børset (born 1958), physician
 Inga Bostad (born 1963), philosopher
 Viggo Brun (1885–1978), mathematician
 Sophus Bugge (1833–1907), linguist
 Fredrik Rosing Bull (1882–1925), data processing pioneer
 Ole-Johan Dahl (1931–2002), computer scientist, Turing Award laureate
 Daniel Cornelius Danielssen (1815–1894), dermatologist
 Finn Devold (1902–1977), marine biologist
 Jon Elster, political science and sociology
 Sam Eyde (1866–1940), inventor and industrialist
 Ragnar Frisch (1895–1973), economist, Nobel laureate
 Johan Galtung, peace and conflict research, The Right Livelihood Award laureate
 Ivar Giaever, physicist, biologist, Nobel laureate
 Johan Ernst Gunnerus (1718–1773), naturalist, bishop of Trondheim
 Gerhard Armauer Hansen (1841–1912), discoverer of the leprosy bacterium
 Odd Hassel (1897–1981), chemist, Nobel laureate (1969)
 Trygve Haavelmo (1911–1999), economist, Nobel laureate
 Christopher Hansteen (1784–1873), physicist and astronomer
 Johan Hjort (1869–1948), marine biologist, oceanographer, fisheries
 Peter M. Haugan, scientist and Director of the Geophysical Institute, University of Bergen
 Anne Stine Ingstad (1918–1997), archaeologist
 Geir Ivarsøy, co-developer of the Opera web browser
 Fred Kavli, inventor, business leader, Kavli prizes
 Jørgen Alexander Knudtzon, linguist
 Lars Monrad Krohn, engineer and entrepreneur
 Finn E. Kydland, economist, Nobel laureate
 Håkon Wium Lie, computer scientist, web pioneer and inventor of Cascading Style Sheets (CSS)
 Sophus Lie (1842–1899), mathematician
 Edvard Moser, neuroscientist, Nobel laureate (2014)
 May-Britt Moser, neuroscientist, Nobel laureate (2014)
 Jørgen Moe, folklorist, author and bishop
 Moltke Moe, folklorist
 Jan Mossin (1936–1987), financial economist
 P. A. Munch (1810–1863), historian
 Kristen Nygaard (1926–2002), computer scientist, Turing Award laureate
 Arne Næss, philosopher
 Lars Onsager (1903–1976), physical chemist, Nobel laureate
 Sverre Petterssen (1898–1974), meteorologist
 Trygve Reenskaug, computer science (model–view–controller)
 Erik S. Reinert, heterodox economist
 Stein Rokkan (1921–1979), political scientist
 Thorleif Schjelderup-Ebbe, Norwegian zoologist
 Atle Selberg (1917–2007), mathematician, Fields Medal laureate
 Thoralf Skolem (1887–1963), mathematician
 Hans Ström (1726–1797), zoologist
 Ragnhild Sundby (1922–2006), zoologist
 Eilert Sundt (1817–1875), sociologist
 Georg Sverdrup (1770–1850), linguist
 Harald Sverdrup (1888–1957), oceanographer and meteorologist
 Ludwig Sylow (1832–1918), mathematician
 Rasmus Sørnes (1893–1967), inventor and clockmaker
 Tor Sørnes, inventor keycard lock
 Vebjørn Tandberg (1904–1978), engineer and industrialist
 Niels Treschow (1751–1833), philosopher
 John Ugelstad (1921–1997), pioneering scientist within the fields of polymer and colloid chemistry
 Olav Vadstein (born 1955), professor of microbial ecology at the Norwegian University of Science and Technology.
 Caspar Wessel (1745–1818), mathematician
 Knut Yrvin, computer scientist, founder and main creator of Skolelinux

Sports 

 Kjetil André Aamodt, alpine ski racer
 Ragnhild Aamodt, handball player
 Th. Valentin Aass, sailor
 Roald Aas, speed skater
 Thomas Alsgaard, cross-country skier
 Alf Andersen, ski jumper
 Frode Andresen, biathlete and cross-country skier
 Hjalmar Andersen, speed skater
 Gunn Margit Andreassen, biathlete
 Johan Anker, sailor
 Berit Aunli, cross-country skier
 Eirik Bakke, footballer
 Ivar Ballangrud, speed skater
 Anders Bardal, ski jumper
 Henning Berg, footballer
 Lars Berger, biathlete
 André Bergdølmo, footballer
 Tora Berger, biathlete
 Hedda Berntsen, skier
 Stig Inge Bjørnebye, footballer
 Ole Einar Bjørndalen, biathlete and coach
 Kristian Bjørnsen, handball player
 Marit Bjørgen, cross-country skier
 Anette Bøe, cross-country skier
 Håvard Bøkko, speed skater
 Lars Bohinen, footballer
 Audun Boysen, middle distance runner
 Oddvar Brå, cross-country skier
 Rune Bratseth, footballer
 Espen Bredesen, ski jumper
 Hans Petter Buraas, alpine skier
 Tony Capaldi, footballer
 Magnus Carlsen, chess grandmaster
 Linda Cerup-Simonsen, sailor
 Egil Danielsen, javelin thrower
 Bjørn Dæhlie, cross-country skier
 Nils Arne Eggen, footballer and football coach
 Toralf Engan, ski jumper
 Stein Eriksen, alpine ski racer
 Frode Estil, cross-country skier
 Bernt Evensen, speed skater
 Johan Remen Evensen, ski jumper
 Maiken Caspersen Falla, cross-country skier
 Jan Åge Fjørtoft, footballer
 Tore André Flo, footballer
 Ivar Formo, cross-county skier
 Daniel Franck, snowboarder
 Stine Brun Kjeldaas, snowboarder
 Torbjørn Falkanger, ski jumper
 Sverre Farstad, speed skater
 Ann Kristin Flatland, biathlete
 Gunn-Rita Dahle Flesjå, mountain biker
 Ole Kristian Furuseth, alpine skier
 Frode Grodås, footballer and coach
 Harald Grønningen, cross-county skier
 Erling Haaland, footballer
 Gunnar Halle, footballer
 Gro Hammerseng-Edin, handball player
 Sverre Ingolf Haugli, speed skater
 Halvard Hanevold, biathlete
 Brede Hangeland, footballer
 Alf Hansen, rower
 Frank Hansen
 Åge Hareide, footballer and coach
 Ola Vigen Hattestad, cross-county skier
 Trine Hattestad, track and field athlete
 Jens Petter Hauge, footballer
 Nina Haver-Løseth, alpine ski racer
 Ada Hegerberg, footballer
 Vegard Heggem, footballer
 Tor Heiestad, shooter
 Albert Helgerud, shooter
 Finn Helgesen, speed skater
 Sonja Henie, figure skater
 Markus Henriksen, footballer
 Tor Arne Hetland, cross-country skier
 Tom Hilde, ski jumper
 Odd-Bjørn Hjelmeset, cross-country skier
 Tom Høgli, footballer
 Petter Hugsted, ski jumper
 Thor Hushovd, road bicycle racer
 Jakob Ingebrigtsen, middle-distance runner
 Odd Iversen, footballer
 Steffen Iversen, footballer
 Anders Jacobsen, ski jumper
 Astrid Uhrenholdt Jacobsen, cross-country skier
 Finn Christian Jagge, alpine skier
 Anne Jahren, cross-county skier
 Kjetil Jansrud, alpine ski racer
 Rune Jarstein, footballer
 Bjørg Eva Jensen, speed skater
 Leif Jenssen, weightlifter
 Knut Johannesen, speed skater
 Stefan Johansen, footballer
 Therese Johaug, cross-country skier
 Erland Johnsen, footballer
 Ronny Johnsen, footballer
 Martin Johnsrud Sundby, cross-country skier
 Jørgen Juve, footballer
 Geir Karlstad, speed skater
 Kristian Kjelling, handball player
 Lasse Kjus, alpine ski racer
 Knut Knudsen, cyclist
 Espen Knutsen, ice hockey player
 Erling Kongshaug, shooter
 Johann Olav Koss, speed skater
 Ingrid Kristiansen. athlete
 Alexander Kristoff, cyclist
 Eirik Kvalfoss, biathlete
 John Larsen, shooter
 Dag Otto Lauritzen, cyclist
 Øyvind Leonhardsen, footballer
 Ole Lilloe-Olsen, shooter
 Roar Ljøkelsøy, ski jumper
 Tom Lund, football coach and player
 Katrine Lunde Haraldsen, handball player
 Kristine Lunde-Borgersen, handball player
 Claus Lundekvam, footballer
 Fred Anton Maier, speed skater
 Andreas Martinsen, ice hockey player
 Oscar Mathisen, speed skater
 Marit Mikkelsplass, cross-country skier
 Magnus Moan, nordic combined skier
 Per Ivar Moe, speed skater
 Thomas Myhre, footballer
 Erik Mykland, footballer
 Magne Myrmo, cross-county skier
 Torger Nergård, curler
 Leif Kristian Haugen, ski racer
 Roger Nilsen, footballer
 Sara Nordenstam, swimmer
 Håvard Nordtveit, footballer
 Sondre Norheim, skier, pioneer of modern skiing
 Petter Northug, cross-country skier
 Katja Nyberg, handball player
 Ørjan Nyland, footballer
 Martin Ødegaard, footballer
 Alexander Dale Oen, swimmer
 Stine Bredal Oftedal, handball player
 Otto Olsen, shooter
 Egil Østenstad, footballer
 Ole Østmo, shooter
 Axel Paulsen, figure skater
 Hilde Gjermundshaug Pedersen, cross-country skier
 Morten Gamst Pedersen, footballer
 Håvard Vad Petersson, curler
 Britt Pettersen, cross-country skier
 Øystein Pettersen, cross-country skier
 Bartosz Piasecki, fencer
 Kjetil Rekdal, footballer
 Linn-Kristin Riegelhuth Koren, handball player
 John Arne Riise, footballer
 Vebjørn Rodal, middle stance athlete
 Willy Røgeberg, shooter
 Bjørn Einar Romøren, ski jumper
 Jon Rønningen, wrestler
 Birger Ruud, ski jumper and alpine skier
 Sigmund Ruud, ski jumper
 Sander Sagosen, handball player
 Ole Selnæs, footballer
 Bente Skari, cross-country skier
 Per Ciljan Skjelbred, footballer
 Liv Grete Skjelbreid, biathlete
 Kristen Skjeldal, cross-country skier
 Vibeke Skofterud, cross-country skier
 Ståle Solbakken, footballer and coach
 Petter Solberg, rally and rallycross driver
 Ole Gunnar Solskjær, footballer
 Ådne Søndrål, speed skater
 Sten Stensen, speed skater
 Ingvild Stensland, footballer
 Martin Stokken, cross-country skier
 Jan Egil Storholt, speed skater
 Kristin Størmer Steira, cross-country skier
 Sverre Strandli, hammer thrower
 Siren Sundby, sailor
 Christoffer Svae, curler 
 Jens Arne Svartedal, cross-county skier
 Emil Hegle Svendsen, biathlete
 Jonas Svensson, footballer
 Aksel Lund Svindal, alpine ski racer
 Magne Thomassen, speed skater
 Patrick Thoresen, ice hockey player
 Andreas Thorkildsen, track and field athlete
 Erik Thorstvedt, footballer
 Ole-Kristian Tollefsen, ice hockey player
 Kari Traa, freestyle skier
 Pål Trulsen, curler
 Olaf Tufte, rower
 Håvard Tvedten, handball player
 Thomas Ulsrud, curler
 Vegard Ulvang, cross-country skier
 Grete Waitz, marathon runner
 Karsten Warholm, athlete
 Bjørn Wirkola, ski jumper
 Mats Zuccarello, ice hockey player

Entrepreneurs, inventors, business 

 Sigval Bergesen d.y., shipping magnate
 Annika Biørnstad (born 1957), media executive
 Thor Bjørklund (1889–1975), inventor of the cheese slicer
 Marianne Heien Blystad (born 1958), lawyer and businesswoman
 Kjerstin Braathen (born 1970), banker, CEO of DNB
 Halfdan Gyth Dehli, businessman and aviator
 Sam Eyde, inventor and industrialist
 John Fredriksen, shipping magnate
 Stein Erik Hagen, businessman
 Siri Hatlen, businessperson
 Alf Ihlen, industrialist
 Anders Jahre, shipping magnate
 Jørgen Jahre, shipowner
 Jannik Lindbæk, banker
 Tove Kvammen Midelfart (born 1951), lawyer and businesswoman
 Susanne Munch Thore (born 1960), lawyer and businesswoman
 Arne Næss Jr., businessman and mountaineer
 Fred Olsen, shipping magnate
 Margareth Øvrum (born 1958), civil engineer and business executive
 Heidi M. Petersen, businesswoman 
 Hilmar Reksten, shipping magnate
 Kjell Inge Røkke, businessman and fisherman
 Peter Arne Ruzicka, businessman
 Julie Skarland (born 1960), fashion designer
 Carl Peter Stoltenberg, merchant and shipowner
 Petter Stordalen, businessman
 Berit Svendsen (born 1963), business executive and engineer
 Anne Carine Tanum (born 1954), business executive
 Olav Thon, real estate developer
 Johan Vaaler (1866–1910)
 Bror With (1900–1985), inventor

World War II 

 Carl Gustav Fleischer (1883–1942), first allied general to win a major victory against the Germans in World War II (Battle of Narvik).
 Gunvald Tomstad (1918–1970), resistance fighter/double agent (radio operator), who helped transmit axis ship movements to the allies and was partly responsible for helping discover and sink the Bismarck.
 Jens Christian Hauge, head of Milorg
 Johan Bernhard Hjort, Gross Kreutz group, White Buses operation
 Leif Larsen a.k.a. "Shetland's Larsen", WWII naval officer
 Arne Brun Lie, resistance
 Martin Linge, commander of SOE Norwegian Independent Company 1
 Max Manus, resistance fighter
 Sigurd Østrem, jurist and Nazi collaborator
 Vidkun Quisling, WWII 'prime minister' by coup d'état 
 Ole Reistad, head of Little Norway
 Henry Rinnan, Gestapo agent, leader of Sonderabteilung Lola
 Otto Ruge, Commander-in-Chief
 Ludwig Schübeler, priest
 Arvid Storsveen, resistance, leader of XU
 Gunnar Sønsteby, resistance fighter

From other categories 
 Svein Oddvar Moen, Football Referee, Ambulance driver
 Arne Arnardo, circus performer and proprietor
 Johannes Berg, central fandom figure
 Astrid Bjellebø Bayegan (born 1943), Norway's first female prost or dean
 Cornelius Cruys, (1655–1727), first commander of the Russian Baltic Fleet
 Dagny Berger (1903–1950), Norway's first woman aviator
 Kristoffer Clausen, media personality
 Louise Kathrine Dedichen (born 1964), vice-admiral
 Andrew Furuseth, (1854–1938), merchant seaman and labour leader
 Lasse Gjertsen, animator and videographer
 Belle Gunness, serial killer
 Anders Behring Breivik, mass murderer
 Mona Grudt, Miss Universe 1990
 Anders Heger, publisher and writer
 Tharald Høyerup Blanc (1838–1921), theatre historian
 Eva Joly, judge
 Tomm Kristiansen, journalist and foreign news correspondent
 Knud Karl Krogh-Tonning (1842–1911), theologian
 Bjørge Lillelien, sports commentator
 Christian Lous Lange, internationalist, Nobel peace-prize laureate
 Erik Meyn (born 1955), television journalist
 Trude Mostue, TV-vet
 Eigil Nansen, humanist and architect
 Annette Obrestad, poker player
 Arne Rinnan, captain of MV Tampa
 Åsne Seierstad, journalist
 Kjersti Løken Stavrum (born 1969), secretary general of the Norwegian Press Association
 Odd Arvid Strømstad (born 1952), television producer and director
 Peter Wessel Tordenskjold (1691–1720), naval hero of the Royal Dano-Norwegian Navy
 Arne Treholt, civil servant, alleged spy for the KGB, convicted of treason
 Linn Ullmann, journalist and author
 Vicky Vette, adult actress & most followed Norwegian on Twitter
 Herman Fredrik Zeiner-Gundersen, Chief of Defence of Norway and Chairman of the NATO Military Committee

See also 

 List of people by nationality
 List of Norwegian Americans

References